Avala Sports Club is the home of the Avala football (soccer) club in Bonnyrigg, New South Wales, Australia.

The ground has played host to some notable matches over the years but none more so than the friendly clash between the Bonnyrigg White Eagles and the high-profile 1991 European Cup Champions Red Star Belgrade who were in Australia on a mid-season break in January 2001.

History
The ground dates back to May 1966 when  of land was purchased for the building of a social club and footballing grounds. Over the years the grounds and club itself were improved when in 1986 it became the permanent home ground for the Bonnyrigg White Eagles.

In 2001, an additional  of land was purchased as part of a plan to renovate the club and expand the training grounds. This was completed in October 2005.

External links
 Bonnyrigg Sports Club Official Website
 Bonnyrigg White Eagles Official Club Website
 Article About Bonnyrigg Sports Club

Bonnyrigg White Eagles FC
Soccer venues in Sydney
1979 establishments in Australia
Sports venues completed in 1979